WJJW (91.1 FM) is a radio station broadcasting a Variety format. Licensed to North Adams, Massachusetts, United States, the station serves the Northern Berkshire County area.  The station is owned by the Massachusetts College of Liberal Arts.

The callsign WJJW had previously been assigned to a Wyandotte, Michigan radio station broadcasting at 103.1 MHz. The station operated from September 11, 1947 to May 1, 1951.

References

External links

JJW
Massachusetts College of Liberal Arts
North Adams, Massachusetts
Mass media in Berkshire County, Massachusetts
Radio stations established in 1973
1973 establishments in Massachusetts